Dipodium parviflorum is an orchid species that is native to Peninsular Malaysia and  Sumatra in Indonesia. The species was formally described in 1911 by Dutch botanist Johannes Jacobus Smith.

In Peninsular Malaysia it has only been recorded in the Sungkap Forest Reserve in Kedah.

References

External links

parviflorum
Orchids of Indonesia
Orchids of Malaysia
Plants described in 1911